Dharoti Khurd is a census town in Ghaziabad district  in the state of Uttar Pradesh, India.Khurd and Kalan Persian language word which means small and Big respectively when two villages have same name then it is distinguished as Kalan means Big and Khurd means Small with Village Name.

Demographics
 India census, Dharoti Khurd had a population of 34,015. Males constitute 54% of the population and females 46%. Dharoti Khurd has an average literacy rate of 58%, lower than the national average of 59.5%: male literacy is 67% and, female literacy is 47%. In Dharoti Khurd, 17% of the population is under 6 years of age.

References

Cities and towns in Ghaziabad district, India